Yeşim Ustaoğlu (born 18 November 1960) is a Turkish filmmaker and screenwriter.

Life and career 
Ustaoğlu was born in Kars, Sarıkamış and grew up in Trabzon on the Black Sea. After studying architecture at Karadeniz Technical University she moved to Istanbul, attended master's programme in Yıldız Technical University, she worked as an architect, then as a journalist and a film critic. Before she made her feature film debut The Trace (İz) in 1994, she had made several award-winning short films. The Trace was entered into the 19th Moscow International Film Festival.

Ustaoğlu received international recognition for her next film, Journey to the Sun (Güneşe Yolculuk), which told a story of a friendship between a Turk and a Kurd. Her fourth film Pandora's Box (Pandora'nın Kutusu) won The Best Film and The Best Actress award in San Sebastian Film Festival and is Ustaoğlu's biggest international success to date.

Filmography

References

External links 
 Official website

1960 births
Living people
People from Çaykara
Turkish women film directors
Turkish female screenwriters
Turkish architects